A trader is a person, firm, or entity in finance who buys and sells financial instruments, such as forex, cryptocurrencies, stocks, bonds, commodities, derivatives, and mutual funds in the capacity of agent, hedger, arbitrageur, or speculator.

Duties and types
Traders buy and sell financial instruments traded in the stock markets, derivatives markets and commodity markets, comprising the stock exchanges, derivatives exchanges, and the commodities exchanges. Several categories and designations for diverse kinds of traders are found in finance, including:

Bond trader
Floor trader
Hedge fund trader
High-frequency trader
Market maker
Pattern day trader
Principal trader
Proprietary trader
Rogue trader
Scalper
Stock trader

Income

According to the Wall Street Journal in 2004, a managing director convertible bond trader was earning between $700,000 and $900,000 on average.

See also
Commodities exchange
Commodity market
Derivatives market
List of commodity traders
List of trading losses
Mismarking
Stock exchange
Stock market
Trading strategy

References

External links

Financial services occupations
Stock market
Commodity markets
Financial markets

no:Trader